The FINA Water Polo Challengers' Cup is an international water polo tournament, organized by FINA. Intended for developing national water polo teams, the biennial tournament was first organized as the FINA World Water Polo Development Trophy in 2007. The tournament is known as the FINA Water Polo Challengers' Cup since the 2019 edition.

Summary

Medal table

Participating nations

References

External links

Official FINA website
2007 Results
2009 Results
2011 Results
2013 Results
2015 Results

 
Recurring sporting events established in 2007